Kwai Chung Incineration Plant was one of four incineration plants in Hong Kong.

The plant was opened in 1978 to process solid waste from Hong Kong to reduce the need to put waste into landfills.

History
The incinerator was built due to the shortage of land available for conventional landfills in Hong Kong. A contract to build the facility, contested by seven international companies, was awarded to Clarke Chapman-John Thompson of Gateshead, England, and signed on 29 November 1973.

An official opening ceremony for the plant was held on 17 October 1978. Unlike older incinerators in Hong Kong, the Kwai Chung plant was fitted with an electrostatic precipitator to reduce the pollution emitted. In addition, the 150-metre-tall chimney at Kwai Chung was taller than those at the Kennedy Town and Lai Chi Kok incinerators, so that pollutants would be dispersed at a higher altitude.

Cessation of operation
In 1989, the Hong Kong Government issued a white paper, Pollution in Hong Kong - A Time to Act.  After considering the effects of air pollution on the environment and public health, it was decided to cease using incineration to dispose of solid waste. This decision was later suspended and, as of 2008, the Hong Kong Government is considering constructing new incinerators.

In May 1997, the Kwai Chung Incineration Plant ceased to operate, the last of Hong Kong's four plants to do so:

 Lai Chi Kok Incineration Plant - commissioned 1969 and decommissioned 1991; now part of the expanded container port area
 Kennedy Town Incineration Plant - commissioned 1967 and located next to Island West Transfer Station; decommissioned 1993 and now berthing facility
 Mui Wo Incineration Plant - commissioned 1987 and decommissioned 1994; now site of Silvermine Bay Outdoor Recreation Camp

Demolition
Although the plant ceased operation in 1997, it was not completely demolished. The site was found to be contaminated with dioxin, furan, asbestos, heavy metals and petroleum hydrocarbons. Special procedures were required during demolition.

Demolition of the building and  chimney was initiated in 2007.

The site cleanup preceded the demolition to clean up potential toxins and for future development of the site.

As of 2017, the Hong Kong government was considering building a public columbarium on the site.

See also
 Waste management in Hong Kong

References

Kwai Chung
Incinerators
Waste management in Hong Kong
Former buildings and structures in Hong Kong
1978 establishments in Hong Kong
1997 disestablishments in Hong Kong